Qasr (also Romanized as Qaşr) is a village in Tabadkan Rural District, in the Central District of Mashhad County, Razavi Khorasan Province, Iran. At the 2006 census, its population was 482, in 125 families.

References 

Populated places in Mashhad County